The PBS Network is an American public broadcaster and non-commercial, free-to-air television network made up to 25 major stations and more than 330 affiliates. This is a table listing of PBS's affiliates, with PBS-majored member stations separated from privately owned member stations, and arranged in alphabetical order by state. There are links to and articles on each of the stations, describing their local programming, hosts, and technical information, such as broadcast frequencies.

The station's virtual (PSIP) channel number follows the call letters. The number in parentheses that follows is the station's actual digital channel number.

Major stations 
Stations are listed in alphabetical order by state and city of license.

Minor stations

Former member stations

References 

PBS member stations
Lists of American television network affiliates